Repro India Ltd. is a provider of print, content and fulfilment solutions based in India.
 The company reported annual revenues of Rs 2874 million for the year ending in March 2022. Repro India is listed on the Bombay Stock Exchange and the National Stock Exchange of India.

References

External links
 

 Repro India kicks-off book revolution in education. "Books will never be unfashionable," says Pramod Khera
 Breaking News: Repro India acquires printing operation of Macmillan
 "The future of books is looking rather good," says Ramu Ramanathan
 Repro India marks success in digital printing with its POD model

Printing companies of India
Book publishing in India
Companies listed on the Bombay Stock Exchange
Companies listed on the National Stock Exchange of India